Blanche Forsythe was a British actress of the silent era. She was born in Islington in the mid-1880s and died in Middlesex in 1953 - aged 80.

Selected filmography
 Sixty Years a Queen (1913)
 East Lynne (1913)
 Jack Tar (1915)
 Jane Shore (1915)
 The Lure of Drink (1915)
 Tommy Atkins (1915)
 Brigadier Gerard (1915)
 The Rogues of London (1915)
 She (1916)
 Trapped by the London Sharks (1916)
 A Just Deception (1917)

References

External links

Year of birth unknown
Year of death unknown
English film actresses
English silent film actresses
20th-century English actresses
People from Islington (district)